Aki Uolevi Parviainen (born 26 October 1974) is a retired Finnish track and field athlete who competed in the javelin throw. He won the gold medal at the 1999 World Championships and the silver medal at the 2001 World Championships. His best throw of 93.09 m, set in 1999, is the Finnish record and ranks him fourth on the overall list. His best Olympic placing was fifth, which he achieved in 2000.

In the spring of 2006, Parviainen announced his retirement due to injuries.

International competitions

Seasonal bests by year
1990 – 63.50
1991 – 79.96
1992 – 80.94
1993 – 69.94
1994 – 78.76
1995 – 85.60
1996 – 84.96
1997 – 87.48
1998 – 90.88
1999 – 93.09
2000 – 90.97
2001 – 92.41
2002 – 82.48
2003 – 83.30
2004 – 79.32
2005 – 83.79

References

Tilastopaja

1974 births
Living people
Athletes from Helsinki
Finnish male javelin throwers
Olympic athletes of Finland
Athletes (track and field) at the 2000 Summer Olympics
World Athletics Championships athletes for Finland
World Athletics Championships medalists
World Athletics Championships winners
20th-century Finnish people
21st-century Finnish people